William Jordan Gillis is an American government official. He has served as Assistant Secretary of Defense for Sustainment since March 2020. He previously served as Principal Deputy Assistant Secretary of the Army for Installations, Energy and Environment (ASA IE&E), and earlier as the Acting Assistant Secretary of the Army for Installations, Energy and Environment from October 16, 2017, until January 10, 2019.

Biography

A native of Atlanta, Gillis is an Eagle Scout. He earned a B.A. from Duke University and an M.B.A. from Emory University 's Goizueta Business School.

He served as a field artillery officer in the U.S. Army at posts including Fort Stewart, Georgia and Ar Ramadi, Iraq, where he was promoted to major. His awards include the Bronze Star Medal, Purple Heart, Army Commendation Medal, and Army Achievement Medal (7th award).

Gillis was a Director in the Energy Practice at ScottMadden, a general management consulting firm. His consulting experience focused on working for electric utility clients across North America in mergers and acquisition integration, business plan development, operational assessments, organization design and staffing, and implementation of departmental and corporate strategy. He also served on the board of Georgia Public Broadcasting and was an active scouting volunteer.

In February 2020, President Donald Trump announced his intention to nominate Gillis to be the next Assistant Secretary of Defense for Sustainment. He appeared before the Senate Committee on Armed Services on March 10, 2020, and was confirmed by voice vote of the full Senate on March 26.

Personal life

Gillis is married and has two children.

References

External links

Living people
Year of birth missing (living people)
People from Atlanta
Duke University alumni
United States Army officers
Emory University alumni
United States Army civilians
Trump administration personnel
United States Assistant Secretaries of Defense